The eMakhosini Ophathe Heritage Park is Nature Reserve located about 10 km south of Ulundi in the KwaZulu-Natal province of South Africa, and lies on the banks of the White Umfolozi River. It recaptures the cultural heritage of the Zulu people, and natural landscape of the valley at the time of King Shaka. The park has an area of 24,000 ha.

Some of the greatest Zulu chiefs of the region, like Nkhosinkulu, Senzangakhona kaJama (father of Shaka, Dingaan and Mpande) and Dinizulu, are buried here.

Wildlife in the park includes: black rhino, buffalo, giraffe, blue wildebeest and various species of antelope. The park is of special importance to the black rhino as it is part of the animal's historic range, which was lost to human encroachment. With the reintroduction of the black rhino into the park and a fencing of the area, over 20,000 hectares of land has been made available for the rhinos again.

See also
 Protected areas of South Africa

References

Ezemvelo KZN Wildlife Parks